WKSZ (95.9 FM, "Kiss FM") is a Top 40/CHR radio station licensed to De Pere, Wisconsin, serving Green Bay and Appleton-Oshkosh and owned by Woodward Communications. WKSZ's studios are located on College Avenue in Appleton, while its transmitter is located near Shirley in the Town of Glenmore.

History
The history of the 95.9 MHz frequency in the Green Bay area dates back to the mid-1980s, with WJLW.  Locally owned by Jack LeDuc (from whom the "JL" of the call letters originated), WJLW broadcast a country music format  until October 1995, when LeDuc sold the station to Woodward Communications.  (LeDuc would resurrect the WJLW call letters, and its country format, one year later at the 106.7 frequency in Green Bay.)

The 95.9 frequency went dormant for a month until November 13, 1995, when Woodward launched WKSZ as "95.9 Kiss FM."  The station was positioned as a Top 40/CHR, putting it in direct competition with Midwest Communications' heritage Top 40/CHR, WIXX.

Kiss FM's ratings managed to hold steady in the middle of the Arbitron ratings for the Green Bay market, thanks to the long-time dominance of WIXX as the premier hit radio station in Northeast Wisconsin.  However, a ratings surge by WKSZ in 2001-2002 had the station beating WIXX in several key younger demographics.  In response, Midwest Communications changed the format of their low-rated adult contemporary station, WLTM, to a rhythmic format as WLYD, "Wild 99.7," and WIXX gravitated to a rock-leaning Top 40/CHR format.

On April 18, 2003, after a stellar first book performance by "Wild", Woodward pulled the plug on "95.9 Kiss FM."  A local research project commissioned by Woodward indicated a format "hole" for hot adult contemporary, and after a weekend of stunting with Christmas music, Woodward launched the new format on WKSZ as "Today's Best Variety, Mix 95.9" on April 21. The first (and what would later be the last) song on "Mix" was "Why Georgia" by John Mayer. The move to hot AC, however, backfired for Woodward, as WKSZ's listener share sank to at or near the bottom of the Arbitron ratings in the Green Bay market.

In February 2006, Midwest Communications dropped WLYD's rhythmic format in favor of adult hits (as WZBY).  One month later, on March 13, at 10 a.m., Woodward would fill the void "Wild 99.7" left behind, flipping WKSZ from Hot AC back to "Kiss FM", mixing Kiss' contemporary hit music with some rhythmic music formerly heard on "Wild." The first song on the revived "Kiss" was "In Da Club" by 50 Cent (by coincidence, also the last song on the first incarnation of "Kiss").  (Reviving the "Kiss FM" moniker was an acknowledgment that listeners still referred to WKSZ by that name, even during its "Mix" days.)  A noticeable addition to "Kiss-FM" after its return was the "tagging" of each song (artist and song title) at its conclusion, regardless of whether a DJ will be heard afterwards.

The 2006 return of “Kiss” paid off, for in the first Arbitron ratings book after the flip (spring 2006), WKSZ leaped to a fourth-place ranking (of 21 stations) with an audience share that was five times greater than the share "Mix 95.9" pulled in during its waning days.  The station finished second place in the fall 2010 Arbitron ratings for the Green Bay market.

On February 15, 2016, WKSZ started simulcasting on sister station WKZY (92.9 FM), which formerly repeated sister station WKZG. The move was done to expand WKSZ's reach to the Fox Valley, as well as southern areas of the market. In addition, Doug Erickson and Mary Love, who were WKSZ's morning hosts from November 2004 until December 2012 (when they moved to WKZG upon that station's launch), returned to host mornings on WKSZ. They remained until September 2017, when they were let go and replaced with former WIXX personalities Jake Kelly and Tanner Jay, who returned to Green Bay after two years at WKTI-FM in Milwaukee.

On September 3, 2021, WKSZ debuted a new logo.

The WKSZ call letters were first used in the Philadelphia market at 100.3 FM (now WRNB) before being relocated to WJLW in 1995.

References

External links

KSZ
Contemporary hit radio stations in the United States